Orlando Drummond Cardoso (18 October 1919 – 27 July 2021) was a Brazilian actor and comedian, best known for his works as Seu Peru in the sitcom Escolinha do Professor Raimundo and also as the voice of the dubbed versions of Scooby-Doo, ALF, and Popeye.

Life and career
Drummond was born in Rio de Janeiro on 18 October 1919. He began working in 1942 as a foley artist and, with help from Paulo Gracindo, started his dubbing career. He also worked as an actor in the films Rei do Movimento (1954) and Angu de Caroço (1955), but he is primarily known for his dubbing works during the 1950s. He acted also in the telenovela Caça Talentos as Zarathustra from 1996 to 1998.

He died on 27 July 2021 from multiple organ failure, at the age of 101. He had also been hospitalised for a urinary tract infection three months before his death. Perhaps as an incredible coincidence, his long-standing friend Mário Monjardim Filho (who voiced Shaggy Rogers, Scooby-Doo's best friend) died only 3 days after Drummond's passing.

Voice acting
 Scooby-Doo<ref name=revista>[https://archive.today/20121227155310/http://www.revistadacultura.com.br:8090/revista/rc53/index2.asp?page=meus_dvds Orlando Drummond fala sobre a arte da dublagem e como criou as vozes de Popeye e Scooby Doo]</ref> in all the series from 1969 to 2010.
 Popeye in all the series of the Company Herbert Richers.
 Alf (series and cartoons)
 Gargamel — The Smurfs in the Hanna-Barbera 1980s show / Papa Smurf — The Smurfs (2011)
 Owl (Winnie-the-Pooh)
 Bionicão : O Show do Bionicão - Dynomutt, Dog Wonder
 Commissioner James Gordon (Pat Hingle) - Batman (second dubbing), Batman Returns, Batman Forever, Batman & Robin (second dubbing)
 Dr. Kawa (Kawashimo Sensei) – Jetta Marusu / Jetter Mars
 Tanaka – Rokumon Tengai Mon Colle Knight    
 Professor Tournesol – The Adventures of Tintin
 Sneezy – Snow White and the Seven Dwarfs
 Lebre de Março — Alice in Wonderland (first dubbing)
 Donald Hayes (Takashi Hayase) – Super Dimensional Fortress Macross
 Warera – Super Dimensional Fortress Macross
 Sr. Smee — Peter Pan
 Gennai – Digimon Adventure
 Gennai Older – Digimon Adventure 02 
 Grim – The Grim Adventures of Billy & Mandy
 Galactor – Science Ninja Team Gatchaman Kagaku Ninjatai Gatchaman
 Marshall Dogus – Groizer X
 Archimede — The Sword in the Stone
 Sr. Dawes Sênior — Mary Poppins (first dubbing)
 Little John — Robin Hood
 Lafayette — The Aristocats
 Pepe Legal (Quick Draw McGraw)
 Pops Racer – (first dubbing) Mach GoGoGo
 Patolino (Daffy Duck) and Frajola (Sylvester the Cat) — Looney Tunes and Uma cilada para Roger Rabbit (Who Framed Roger Rabbit)
 Thing — Fantastic Four
 Trailbreaker – (second dubbing) – Transformers: Generation 1
 Yar – Dinosaur
 Yukk – Mighty Man and Yukk
 Oliver Hardy — Laurel and Hardy
 General Patton — Patton
 Unicron – Transformers the Movie (VHS dubbing)
 Venger - Dungeons & Dragons (TV series)

References

1919 births
2021 deaths
Brazilian centenarians
Brazilian male film actors
Brazilian male stage actors
Brazilian male telenovela actors
Brazilian male voice actors
Brazilian male comedians
Male actors from Rio de Janeiro (city)
Men centenarians
20th-century Brazilian male actors
21st-century Brazilian male actors
Brazilian people of Scottish descent
Brazilian people of Portuguese descent
Deaths from multiple organ failure